Zinzi Elna Chabangu (born 28 September 1996) is a South African athlete specialising in the triple jump. She won a silver medal at the 2018 African Championships in Asaba with 13.59 metres and a bronze medal at the 2019 African Games with the same result. She's the South African record holder with a jump of 14.02m, this feet happened at Tuks Sports Athletics track March 2020.

Competition record

References

1996 births
Living people
South African female triple jumpers
Athletes (track and field) at the 2015 African Games
Athletes (track and field) at the 2019 African Games
African Games bronze medalists for South Africa
African Games medalists in athletics (track and field)
Competitors at the 2015 Summer Universiade
Competitors at the 2019 Summer Universiade
South African Athletics Championships winners